The Nokia X2-00 is the first low budget phone in the Xseries line from Nokia. This single SIM phone was announced in April 2010 and was released 3 months later in July 2010. It runs on Series 40 and comes with many pre-installed games and also supports messaging and data-connections.

Features
The phone has 240 X 320 256K TFT display with screen of 2.20 inches (~28.7% screen to body ratio) and weighs 81.00gm. It comes with a rear camera of 5MP of 2592 x 1944 px and it also has video recording of QVGA with 320 x 240px. Data connection is through GPRS and EDGE. The device also supports bluetooth and USB connections but lacks infrared, Wi-Fi and GPS. It has a RAM of 64MB, ROM of 128MB and supports expandable memory of 16GB microSD. It's 860mAh (BL-4C) removable battery supports standby of 624 hours and talk time of 13h 30min. It has a SAR EU 0.82 W/kg (head).

Appearance

The aluminium back panel gives a metallic appearance to the feature phone. It comes in 2 colors which are red on black and blue on silver.

Multimedia
The phone is good for its multimedia features. It supports MIDP1.0 JAVA. The phone can successfully play MP3, WMV, NRT (Nokia Ringing Tone), WMA and eAAC+ audios and also MP4, H.263 videos. The inbuilt antennae gives clarity to the FM Radio and also has RDS stereo. On the left side seek and play/pause buttons are used to control the music/video/radio. The photo editor software in this phone also adds effects to the photos.

Games
There are 8 games on the Nokia X2-00: Bounce Tales, City Bloxx, Diamond Rush, Sudoku, Snake III, Brain Champion, Block'd and Rally 3D.

Data Connections
The device supports networking via GPRS and EDGE. It also has a maximum download speed of 0.236 Mbit/s.

See also
 List of Nokia products

References

External links
 Nokia X2-00 Price in India

X2-00
Mobile phones introduced in 2010
Nokia XSeries
Mobile phones with user-replaceable battery